Agony Again is a British sitcom that aired on BBC1 in 1995. Starring Maureen Lipman, it is the sequel to Agony, an ITV sitcom that aired from 1979 to 1981, produced by the BBC after ITV turned it down; It had originally been pitched as a radio version for Radio 4. Agony Again was written by Carl Gorham, Michael Hatt, and Amanda Swift.

Cast
Maureen Lipman – Jane Lucas
Maria Charles – Bea Fisher
David Harewood – Daniel
Doon Mackichan – Debra
Sacha Grunpeter – Michael
Niall Buggy – Richard
Valerie Edmond – Catherine
Robert Whitson – Will Brewer
Simon Williams – Laurence Lucas

Background
Fourteen years after Agony ended on ITV, the BBC revived it as Agony Again. The BBC had also revived other sitcoms, including Doctor in the House, The Liver Birds, and Reginald Perrin in the 1990s. Some of the original cast were used, although Simon Williams' character Laurence is not a main character like before.

Plot
Jane Lucas now has her own television show, Lucas Live, but as before she neglects her own problems, including her son (who comes out as gay during the series), and focuses on other people's, especially homeless former businessman Richard. She has the beginnings of a romance with Daniel, a social worker. Jane's producer is Debra and her mother Bea, who was determined for her to remarry, is still a main character.

Episodes
"Heartbreak Hotel" (31 August 1995)
"Love Will Find a Way" (7 September 1995)
"Dazed and Confused" (14 September 1995)
"Soap Dish" (21 September 1995)
"Hound Dog" (28 September 1995)
"Breaking Point" (5 October 1995)
"Showtime'" (12 October 1995)

References
Mark Lewisohn, "Radio Times Guide to TV Comedy", BBC Worldwide Ltd, 2003
British TV Comedy Guide for Agony Again

External links

1995 British television series debuts
1995 British television series endings
1990s British sitcoms
BBC television sitcoms
English-language television shows